The 1846 Connecticut gubernatorial election was held on April 6, 1846. Former congressman and Democratic nominee Isaac Toucey was elected, defeating former state legislator and Whig nominee Clark Bissell with 47.54% of the vote.

Although Bissell won a plurality of the vote, he did not win a majority. The state constitution at the time required that in such a case, the Connecticut General Assembly decides the election. The state legislature voted for Toucey, 124 to 117, and Toucey became the governor.

General election

Candidates
Major party candidates

Isaac Toucey, Democratic
Clark Bissell, Whig

Minor party candidates

Francis Gillette, Liberty

Results

References

1846
Connecticut
Gubernatorial